Irish abortion referendum 1992 can refer to any of three abortion amendments put to referendum that year:

 Twelfth Amendment of the Constitution Bill 1992
 Thirteenth Amendment of the Constitution of Ireland
 Fourteenth Amendment of the Constitution of Ireland